José Carvalho (born 15 June 1953) is a Portuguese hurdler and sprinter. He competed in the 400 metres and 400 metres hurdles at the 1976 Summer Olympics.

References

1953 births
Living people
Athletes (track and field) at the 1972 Summer Olympics
Athletes (track and field) at the 1976 Summer Olympics
Portuguese male sprinters
Portuguese male hurdlers
Olympic athletes of Portugal
Place of birth missing (living people)